Nilton Pereira Mendes or simply Mendes (January 7, 1976 – September 18, 2006) was a Brazilian professional footballer. He was born in Governador Valadares.

Death
Mendes collapsed on the pitch during a training match for his club FC Shakhter Karagandy and died on the way to the hospital at Karagandy.

Honours

Club
 Irtysh
Kazakhstan Premier League winner (1): 1999.
Kazakhstan Premier League bronze (1): 2000.

 Astana-1964
Kazakhstan Premier League bronze (1): 2003.
Kazakhstan Cup winner (2): 2002, 2005
Kazakhstan Cup runner-up (1): 2001

Individual
 Kazakhstan Premier League top scorer: 2000 (21 goals).
 Kazakhstan Premier League best foreign player: 2002.

References

1976 births
2006 deaths
Brazilian footballers
Association football players who died while playing
FC Zhemchuzhina Sochi players
Russian Premier League players
Expatriate footballers in Russia
FC Irtysh Pavlodar players
FC Shakhter Karagandy players
Kazakhstan Premier League players
Brazilian expatriate footballers
Expatriate footballers in Kazakhstan
Brazilian expatriate sportspeople in Kazakhstan
FC Zhenis Astana players
People from Governador Valadares
Association football forwards
Sport deaths in Kazakhstan
Sportspeople from Minas Gerais